Filial is a rural locality (a settlement) in Biryulinskoye Rural Settlement of Mayminsky District, the Altai Republic, Russia. The population was 27 as of 2016.

Geography 
Filial is located in the valley of the Mayma River, 25 km south of Mayma (the district's administrative centre) by road. Kyzyl-Ozek and Biryulya are the nearest rural localities.

References 

Rural localities in Mayminsky District